Amaurodon caeruleocaseus is a species of fungus in the family Thelephoraceae. It was described by Sven Svantesson and Tom W. May in 2021. It is unique within its genus in that its basidiome is stipitate. The specific epithet is Latin (a compound of 'blue' and 'cheese'), named for the basidiome's resemblance to blue cheese. The type locality is Denmark, Western Australia.

See also 
 
 Fungi of Australia

References

External links 
 

Thelephorales
Fungi described in 2021
Fungi of Australia
Taxa named by Tom May (mycologist)